Occipital nerve block is a procedure involving injection of steroids or anesthetics into regions of the greater occipital nerve and the lesser occipital nerve used to treat chronic headaches.

These nerves are located in the back of the head near in the suboccipital triangle along the line between the inion and the mastoid process. They innervate muscles in the suboccipital and posterior scalp regions. The injection will either block pain signals or reduce swelling and inflammation in these regions depending on the choice of injection. The procedure is helpful in treating occipital neuralgia and chronic headaches that arise from the neck.


Procedure
The patient is kept conscious for the duration of the procedure. A small gauge needle is inserted at points of the greater and lesser occipital nerves down to the periosteum of the occiput. Some pain may be felt during the insertion of the needle through the skin. Injected anesthetics give pain relief almost immediately while steroid injections take 3–5 days to provide relief. The procedure has no major common complications, but some uncommon risks include bleeding, especially if on blood thinning medication, infection, and nerve damage.

Studies 
In 2018, the Journal of the American Board of Family Medicine has carried out a study to examine the efficacity of occipital nerve block in mitigating migraine. The experimentation was done on 592 patients who had migraines and when they underwent greater occipital nerve block, 82% of them reported significant reduction of the pain. Though, the study was revealed possibilities to conclude its usage as effective, some parts of the medical community expressed that the test needs to be carried out on greater sample space before remarking anything conclusive.

Notes

Headaches
Regional anesthesia